Petre Gruzinsky (28 March 1920 – 13 August 1984) was a Georgian poet and Honored Artist of the Georgian SSR (1979). He was a son of Prince Pyotr Aleksandrovich Gruzinsky and a scion of King George XII of Georgia.

Biography
Gruzinsky was a descendant of the Kakhetian branch (Gruzinsky) of the Bagrationi Dynasty, a former royal house of Georgia. His grandfather Alexander Bagration-Gruzinsky was son of Prince Bagrat of Georgia, the fourth son of King George XII of Georgia. Petre's literary career began in 1933, under the penname of Tamarashvili. Gruzinsky gained popularity as an author of lyrics for the songs by Revaz Lagidze, Giorgi Tsabadze, and Giya Kancheli, including for Lagidze's Tbiliso (Song of Tbilisi), one of the best known Georgian songs, and for the cult Soviet comedy Mimino (1977).

Gruzinsky was arrested and tried on charges of anti-Soviet activities and monarchist plot in 1945 and confined in a mental facility until released in 1948. Many of his literary works afterwards were published under the names of Gruzinsky's wife Liya Mgeladze and the journalist Irakli Gotsiridze. His first collection of poetry was published posthumously, in 2001. Gruzinsky died in 1984. He is buried at the Svetitskhoveli Cathedral in Mtskheta.

Family
Petre Gruzinsky was married twice. He married in 1939 Ketevan Siradze (born 9 April 1915), daughter of Filimon Siradze, and had a daughter:

 Dali Bagration-Gruzinsky (born 1939). She married first at Tiflis, Bruno Babunoshvili (1938-1993). Secondly, she married Zurab Vakhtangovitch Kurashvili (born 1950).

In 1944, Gruzinsky married his second wife, Liya Mgeladze (born 19 August 1925, Manglisi), daughter of Dimitri Mgeladze (1889–1979), the literary scholar and former member of the government of the Democratic Republic of Georgia, and wife. They had two children:

 Mzia Bagration-Gruzinsky (born 1945).
 Nugzar Bagration-Gruzinsky (born 1950), a theatre director and claimant to the headship of the royal house of Georgia.

Honours
 Honoured Art Worker (1979).

References

Further reading 

ბაგრატიონები.-თბ., 2003.-გვ.537.
ბაგრატოვანნი.-2004.-ტ.2.-გვ.76.
კიკნაძე ვ. საქართველოს სამეფო ტახტის მემკვიდრე ოჯახი.-თბ., 2006.-გვ.14.
პეტრე ბაგრატიონ-გრუზინსკი.-თბ., 2004.-გვ.73,82-83.
საქართველოს რესპუბლიკა.-2001.-4სექტ.-გვ.12.-2000.-14ოქტ.-გვ.8.
ჯაგოდნიშვილი თ. ერეკლეს ეპოსი.-თბ., 2005.-გვ.182.
ჯავახიშვილი ნ. ნარკვევები ქართველი და ადიღელი ხალხების ურთიერთობის ისტორიიდან.-თბ., 2005.-გვ.251.
Джавахишвили Н. Грузины под российским флагом.-Тб., 2003.-с.177,180.
საქართველოს თავადაზნაურობა.-თბ.,2010.-გვ.146. 
Кеснер Д. Сцена.-Канада-г.Виктория,2011.-с.32.

1920 births
1984 deaths
Bagrationi dynasty of the Kingdom of Kartli-Kakheti
Male poets from Georgia (country)
Writers from Tbilisi
Petre Gruzinsky
Burials at Svetitskhoveli Cathedral
20th-century poets from Georgia (country)
Soviet poets